Elrose is a historic house located at 217 West University Avenue in Lafayette, Louisiana.

Built in 1900 by Crow Girard, the house is a large -story frame residence in Queen Anne style with Colonial Revival elements. The distinctive roofline comprises an octagonal corner turret, a central dormer, and a very large side dormer.

The house was listed on the National Register of Historic Places on June 14, 1984.

See also
 National Register of Historic Places listings in Lafayette Parish, Louisiana

References

Houses on the National Register of Historic Places in Louisiana
Colonial Revival architecture in Louisiana
Queen Anne architecture in Louisiana
Houses completed in 1900
Lafayette Parish, Louisiana
National Register of Historic Places in Lafayette Parish, Louisiana